River Philip is a Canadian rural community in Cumberland County, Nova Scotia that was founded by George Oxley. The centre of the community is located near the intersection of Route 321 and Wyvern Road.

It is situated in a small valley formed by the River Philip, from which it derives its name.

Communities in Cumberland County, Nova Scotia